Nicole Titihuia Hawkins is a New Zealand poet. In 2022 she won an Ockham New Zealand Book Award.

Biography 
Hawkins trained as a high school teacher and taught English, social studies and tikanga Māori. She has organised literary events such as Rhyme Time, a regional youth event, and Poetry in Motion, to encourage youth to perform their original poetry.

In 2022 her first book of poetry, Whai, won the Jessie Mackay Prize for best first book of poetry at the Ockham New Zealand Book Awards.

Hawkins affiliates to Ngāti Kahungunu ki Te Wairoa and Ngāti Pāhauwera iwi.

References 

21st-century New Zealand poets
Ngāti Pāhauwera people
Ngāti Kahungunu people
Year of birth missing (living people)
Living people